Elections to the Manipur Legislative Assembly were held in February 1995, to elect members of the 60 constituencies in Manipur, India. The Indian National Congress won the most seats as well as the popular vote, and its leader, Rishang Keishing was re-appointed as the Chief Minister of Manipur.

After the passing of the North-Eastern Areas (Reorganisation) Act, 1971, Manipur was converted from a Union Territory to a State and the size of its Legislative Assembly was increased from 30 to 60 members. The constituencies were changed in 1976 by The Delimitation of Parliamentary and Assembly Constituencies Order, 1976.

Result

Elected Members

See also 
 List of constituencies of the Manipur Legislative Assembly
 1995 elections in India

References

Manipur
1995
1995